Gornji Gajtan is a village in the municipality of Medveđa, Serbia. According to the 2002 census, the village has a population of 87 people.

See also
Putinovo

References

Populated places in Jablanica District